Everyone's a Wally is a British video game released in 1985 by Mikro-Gen for the ZX Spectrum, Amstrad CPC, and Commodore 64. The sequel to Pyjamarama, it features the same hero character, Wally Week, and uses an upgraded version of the same game engine.

Gameplay

Everyone's a Wally was the first arcade adventure game to feature multiple playable characters: Wally Week (a builder and handyman), Wilma (his wife), Tom (a punk mechanic), Dick (a plumber) and Harry (a hippie electrician). Herbert, the baby son of Wally and Wilma, appeared in the game as a mobile hazard NPC. The player can change character when in the same location as another - those not being controlled wander around the village carrying on their own chores and business. The character switch and the chores attendance simulation were original at the time. The energy ("endurance") of each character is decreased when in contact with NPCs; the game ends if characters deplete their energy.

The aim of the game is to complete a day's worth of work for each character and retrieve the compensation at the bank, to allow the well deserved "break" - as the code of the firm registered at the bank will spell - from job to job. The player will find out that Wally can build a wall at the construction site and maintain the cranes at the dock (and more) to obtain his part of the check; Wilma will act as a librarian etc. The game is a structure of puzzles where jobs successfully carried on enable to unlock more accomplishments: repairing the fountain enables collecting water to make cement to build the wall, etc.

Development

Everyone's a Wally started out as Life of Wally and was written by Chris Hinsley in 1985 - although in an interview with Crash, Paul Denial stated that the entire Mikro-Gen team had input into both character design and coding.

The game (as Life) was given an advance mention in Pyjamarama, released the year before.

Song

The original tape cassette version of Everyone's a Wally featured a Mike Berry song about the game recorded as an audio track on the B side.

References

External links
 Game of the Week from Zzap!64
 Game review from CRASH

1985 video games
Amstrad CPC games
Commodore 64 games
Mikro-Gen games
Single-player video games
Video games developed in the United Kingdom
ZX Spectrum games